Kocakonak is a village in the Sındırgı district of Balıkesir province in Turkey.

References

Villages in Sındırgı District